William Moore (born May 18, 1985) is a former American football strong safety who spent his whole career with the Atlanta Falcons of the National Football League (NFL).  He played college football at University of Missouri.  He was chosen by the Falcons in the second round of the 2009 NFL Draft.

Early years
While at Hayti High School Moore was a standout wide receiver and cornerback earning all-state honors on both sides of the ball. While at Hayti he helped them win three consecutive conference championships from 2001 to 2003. He finished his high school career with a school record 74 receptions for 1,768 yards and 34 touchdowns.

College career
Moore chose to play college football at the University of Missouri over schools such as Oklahoma, Purdue, Mississippi, Arkansas and Illinois, among others. After being redshirted as a freshman in 2004, he played in nine games in 2005, starting two of them, finishing the season with 30 tackles and one interception. As a sophomore in 2006 he played in all 13 games, with four starts. He finished the season with 51 tackles and an interception. As a junior in 2007 Moore recorded 117 tackles and set a school record with eight interceptions, returning one for a touchdown. His play earned him All-American and All-Big 12 first-team honors. As a senior in 2008, he battled through numerous injuries which cost him to miss two full games and parts of two others. Despite the injuries he finished the season with 85 tackles and an interception.

Moore finished his college career with 284 tackles, 11 interceptions, three sacks, and a school record four interception return touchdowns.

Professional career
Moore was drafted by the Atlanta Falcons in the second round of the 2009 NFL Draft.  He wore the number 25 to honor his Missouri teammate Aaron O'Neal, who died during a voluntary workout in the summer of 2005.

Moore played only two games in his rookie season, however in his 2010 season, he played 16 games, recording 82 total tackles, 5 interceptions, and one forced fumble. He was the fifth-leading tackler for the Atlanta Falcons in 2010, and was tied with Brent Grimes as the leader in interceptions, with five each. Moore also played with a former Missouri Tigers teammate, Sean Weatherspoon. Moore was named to the 2013 Pro Bowl as a replacement for Donte Whitner.
On March 9, 2013, Moore signed a five-year, $32 million contract to stay with the Falcons. On February 8, 2016, Moore was released by the Falcons even with two years left on his contract.

NFL career statistics

References

External links
Atlanta Falcons bio
Mizzou Tigers bio

1985 births
Living people
People from Hayti, Missouri
American football safeties
Missouri Tigers football players
Atlanta Falcons players
Players of American football from Missouri
National Conference Pro Bowl players